Anastasoff v. United States, 223 F.3d 898 (8th Cir. 2000), was a case decided by the U.S. Eighth Circuit on appeal from the U.S. District Court for the Eastern District of Missouri. It is notable for being the only case to consider the "Anastasoff issue", that is whether Article Three of the United States Constitution requires a federal court to treat unpublished opinions as precedent.

The case was subsequently vacated as moot on rehearing en banc, due to the government's decision to pay the taxpayer's claim in full with interest at the statutory rate. In the final decision, the court opinion stated:

Before being overturned, the Anastasoff decision was cited by multiple courts that used unpublished opinions in their decisions, such as United States v. Goldman, No. 00-1276 of September 29, 2000, and United States v. Langmade, No. 00-2019 of December 29, 2000.

See also 
 Non-publication of legal opinions in the United States

References 

United States Constitution Article Three case law
2000 in United States case law
United States Court of Appeals for the Eighth Circuit cases